Thomas or Tom Fletcher may refer to:

Politicians
Thomas Fletcher (American politician) (1779–?), U.S. Representative from Kentucky
Thomas Fletcher (Arkansas politician) (1817–1880), Acting Governor of Arkansas, 1862
Thomas Fletcher (British politician) (1522–1568), Member of Parliament for Rye
Thomas Fletcher (Canadian politician) (1852–?), Member of the British Columbia Legislative Assembly for Alberni
Thomas B. Fletcher (1879–1945), U.S. Representative from Ohio
Thomas Clement Fletcher (1827–1899), 18th Governor of Missouri

Sports
Thomas Fletcher (cricketer) (1881–1954), English cricketer
Thomas Fletcher (footballer) (1878–?), English footballer
Thomas Fletcher (rugby) (1874–1950), English rugby union, and rugby league footballer who played in the 1890s and 1900s
Thomas Fletcher (American football), NFL player
Tom Fletcher (baseball) (1942–2018), Major League Baseball pitcher

Others
Thomas Fletcher (bishop) (died 1761), Irish bishop
Thomas Fletcher (diplomat) (born 1975), British Ambassador to Lebanon
Thomas Fletcher (poet) (1666–1713), English poet and priest
Thomas Fletcher (silversmith) (1787–1866), American silversmith
Thomas Bainbrigge Fletcher (1878–1950), English entomologist
Tom Fletcher (born 1985), English musician and frontman of McFly
Tom Fletcher (vaudeville) (1873–1954), American vaudeville performer and autobiographer
Tom Fletcher (Home and Away), fictional character portrayed by Roger Oakley in the Australian soap opera Home and Away

See also
Thomas Fletcher Oakes (1843–1919), president of Northern Pacific Railway
Thomas Fletcher Waghorn (1800–1850), postal pioneer
Tom Fletcher Mayson (1893–1958), British recipient of the Victoria Cross